"Who You Gonna Blame It On This Time" is a song co-written and recorded by American country music artist Vern Gosdin.  It was released in January 1989 as the fourth single from the album Chiseled in Stone.  The song reached #2 on the Billboard Hot Country Singles & Tracks chart.  Gosdin wrote the song with Hank Cochran.

Chart performance

Year-end charts

References

1989 singles
Vern Gosdin songs
Songs written by Hank Cochran
Songs written by Vern Gosdin
Song recordings produced by Bob Montgomery (songwriter)
Columbia Records singles
1988 songs